Tricholoma acerbum is a mushroom of the agaric family Tricholomataceae.  It is found in Europe and North America.

See also
List of North American Tricholoma species
List of Tricholoma species
List of fungi by conservation status

References

Fungi described in 1792
Fungi of Europe
Fungi of North America
acerbum